The following is a list of players, both past and current, who appeared at least in one game for the Indiana Pacers NBA franchise.

Players
Note: Statistics are correct through the end of the  season.

A to B

|-
|align="left"| || align="center"|F || align="left"|Indiana || align="center"|1 || align="center"| || 29 || 259 || 40 || 18 || 59 || 8.9 || 1.4 || 0.6 || 2.0 || align=center|
|-
|align="left"| || align="center"|F || align="left"|Michigan State || align="center"|1 || align="center"| || 45 || 637 || 160 || 18 || 252 || 14.2 || 3.6 || 0.4 || 5.6 || align=center|
|-
|align="left"| || align="center"|G || align="left"|Penn || align="center"|1 || align="center"| || 51 || 692 || 65 || 109 || 164 || 13.6 || 1.3 || 2.1 || 3.2 || align=center|
|-
|align="left"| || align="center"|F/C || align="left"|Temple || align="center"|4 || align="center"|– || 217 || 3,652 || 1,000 || 212 || 960 || 16.8 || 4.6 || 1.0 || 4.4 || align=center|
|-
|align="left"| || align="center"|F/C || align="left"|UNLV || align="center"|1 || align="center"| || 60 || 753 || 222 || 14 || 213 || 12.6 || 3.7 || 0.2 || 3.6 || align=center|
|-
|align="left"| || align="center"|G || align="left"|West Virginia || align="center"|1 || align="center"| || 27 || 164 || 12 || 10 || 66 || 6.1 || 0.4 || 0.4 || 2.4 || align=center|
|-
|align="left"| || align="center"|G || align="left"|Georgia Tech || align="center"|1 || align="center"| || 44 || 905 || 81 || 125 || 262 || 20.6 || 1.8 || 2.8 || 6.0 || align=center|
|-
|align="left"| || align="center"|G/F || align="left"|Fresno State || align="center"|3 || align="center"|– || 197 || 3,287 || 615 || 268 || 1,526 || 16.7 || 3.1 || 1.4 || 7.7 || align=center|
|-
|align="left"| || align="center"|F/C || align="left"|UCLA || align="center"|2 || align="center"|– || 14 || 36 || 12 || 1 || 13 || 2.6 || 0.9 || 0.1 || 0.9 || align=center|
|-
|align="left"| || align="center"|G || align="left"|Fayetteville State || align="center"|1 || align="center"| || 81 || 1,275 || 135 || 191 || 457 || 15.7 || 1.7 || 2.4 || 5.6 || align=center|
|-
|align="left"| || align="center"|F || align="left"|Notre Dame || align="center"|2 || align="center"|– || 43 || 260 || 43 || 6 || 102 || 6.0 || 1.0 || 0.1 || 2.4 || align=center|
|-
|align="left" bgcolor="#FFCC00"|+ || align="center"|F || align="left"|St. John's || align="center"|5 || align="center"|– || 193 || 6,744 || 1,010 || 577 || 3,189 || 34.9 || 5.2 || 3.0 || 16.5 || align=center|
|-
|align="left"| || align="center"|G/F || align="left"|Memphis || align="center"|1 || align="center"| || 41 || 822 || 98 || 90 || 233 || 20.0 || 2.4 || 2.2 || 5.7 || align=center|
|-
|align="left"| || align="center"|G || align="left"|Texas || align="center"|1 || align="center"| || 76 || 1,226 || 91 || 170 || 356 || 16.1 || 1.2 || 2.2 || 4.7 || align=center|
|-
|align="left"| || align="center"|F/C || align="left"|Saint Joseph's || align="center"|5 || align="center"|– || 355 || 11,045 || 2,357 || 1,048 || 4,876 || 31.1 || 6.6 || 3.0 || 13.7 || align=center|
|-
|align="left"| || align="center"|G || align="left"|Brazil || align="center"|1 || align="center"| || 22 || 436 || 49 || 33 || 196 || 19.8 || 2.2 || 1.5 || 8.9 || align=center|
|-
|align="left"| || align="center"|G || align="left"|Akron || align="center"|1 || align="center"| || 12 || 73 || 8 || 8 || 27 || 6.1 || 0.7 || 0.7 || 2.3 || align=center|
|-
|align="left"| || align="center"|G || align="left"|Tennessee State || align="center"|3 || align="center"|– || 139 || 3,187 || 254 || 411 || 1,163 || 22.9 || 1.8 || 3.0 || 8.4 || align=center|
|-
|align="left"| || align="center"|F || align="left"|Michigan || align="center"|2 || align="center"| || 74 || 622 || 126 || 23 || 205 || 8.4 || 1.7 || 0.3 || 2.8 || align=center|
|-
|align="left"| || align="center"|F || align="left"|Temple || align="center"|1 || align="center"| || 13 || 113 || 25 || 2 || 36 || 8.7 || 1.9 || 0.2 || 2.8 || align=center|
|-
|align="left"| || align="center"|F || align="left"|Arizona State || align="center"|2 || align="center"|– || 133 || 2,344 || 596 || 67 || 1,169 || 17.6 || 4.5 || 0.5 || 8.8 || align=center|
|-
|align="left"| || align="center"|F/C || align="left"|Minnesota || align="center"|1 || align="center"| || 51 || 1,131 || 333 || 65 || 572 || 22.2 || 6.5 || 1.3 || 11.2 || align=center|
|-
|align="left"| || align="center"|F || align="left"|Picayune Memorial HS (MS) || align="center"|7 || align="center"|– || 237 || 3,555 || 530 || 154 || 1,335 || 15.0 || 2.2 || 0.6 || 5.6 || align=center|
|-
|align="left"| || align="center"|F || align="left"|Pittsburgh || align="center"|2 || align="center"|– || 98 || 1,196 || 330 || 92 || 388 || 12.2 || 3.4 || 0.9 || 4.0 || align=center|
|-
|align="left"| || align="center"|G || align="left"|Georgia Tech || align="center"|7 || align="center"|– || 469 || 10,327 || 846 || 1,785 || 3,809 || 22.0 || 1.8 || 3.8 || 8.1 || align=center|
|-
|align="left"| || align="center"|G/F || align="left"|Croatia || align="center"|2 || align="center"|– || 161 || 5,037 || 603 || 280 || 2,595 || 31.3 || 3.7 || 1.7 || 16.1 || align=center|
|-
|align="left"| || align="center"|F || align="left"|Auburn Montgomery || align="center"|1 || align="center"| || 5 || 11 || 6 || 1 || 0 || 2.2 || 1.2 || 0.2 || 0.0 || align=center|
|-
|align="left"| || align="center"|F || align="left"|Cincinnati || align="center"|1 || align="center"| || 42 || 426 || 57 || 14 || 245 || 10.1 || 1.4 || 0.3 || 5.8 || align=center|
|-
|align="left"| || align="center"|F || align="left"|Clemson || align="center"|1 || align="center"| || 17 || 269 || 77 || 17 || 91 || 15.8 || 4.5 || 1.0 || 5.4 || align=center|
|-
|align="left"| || align="center"|G/F || align="left"|North Carolina || align="center"|2 || align="center"|– || 164 || 3,894 || 416 || 440 || 1,345 || 23.7 || 2.5 || 2.7 || 8.2 || align=center|
|-
|align="left"| || align="center"|F/C || align="left"|SMU || align="center"|1 || align="center"| || 62 || 680 || 173 || 46 || 338 || 11.0 || 2.8 || 0.7 || 5.5 || align=center|
|-
|align="left"| || align="center"|G || align="left"|Auburn || align="center"|3 || align="center"|– || 36 || 283 || 28 || 44 || 58 || 7.9 || 0.8 || 1.2 || 1.6 || align=center|
|-
|align="left"| || align="center"|C || align="left"|Slovenia || align="center"|3 || align="center"|– || 62 || 343 || 66 || 13 || 113 || 5.5 || 1.1 || 0.2 || 1.8 || align=center|
|-
|align="left"| || align="center"|G || align="left"|Oregon || align="center"|1 || align="center"| || 65 || 894 || 69 || 125 || 322 || 13.8 || 1.1 || 1.9 || 5.0 || align=center|
|-
|align="left"| || align="center"|F || align="left"|La Salle || align="center"|1 || align="center"| || 10 || 148 || 28 || 11 || 33 || 14.8 || 2.8 || 1.1 || 3.3 || align=center|
|-
|align="left" bgcolor="#FFFF99"|^ (#35) || align="center"|G/F || align="left"|Dayton || align="center"|8 || align="center"|– || 559 || 20,315 || 3,609 || 2,214 || 10,058 || 36.3 || 6.5 || 4.0 || 18.0 || align=center|
|-
|align="left"| || align="center"|G/F || align="left"|Arkansas || align="center"|1 || align="center"| || 82 || 1,586 || 288 || 159 || 544 || 19.3 || 3.5 || 1.9 || 6.6 || align=center|
|-
|align="left"| || align="center"|G || align="left"|Indiana || align="center"|1 || align="center"| || 32 || 419 || 51 || 86 || 117 || 13.1 || 1.6 || 2.7 || 3.7 || align=center|
|-
|align="left"| || align="center"|F || align="left"|Arizona || align="center"|1 || align="center"| || 49 || 729 || 121 || 49 || 216 || 14.9 || 2.5 || 1.0 || 4.4 || align=center|
|-
|align="left" bgcolor="#FFCC00"|+ || align="center"|G || align="left"|Evansville || align="center"|7 || align="center"|–– || 539 || 15,681 || 1,635 || 2,737 || 4,145 || 29.1 || 3.0 || 5.1 || 7.7 || align=center|
|-
|align="left"| || align="center"|G/F || align="left"|La Salle || align="center"|1 || align="center"| || 50 || 378 || 41 || 17 || 136 || 7.6 || 0.8 || 0.3 || 2.7 || align=center|
|-
|align="left"| || align="center"|C || align="left"|St. Joseph HS (NJ) || align="center"|1 || align="center"| || 2 || 36 || 19 || 2 || 23 || 18.0 || 9.5 || 1.0 || 11.5 || align=center|
|-
|align="left"| || align="center"|F || align="left"|Syracuse || align="center"|1 || align="center"| || 80 || 1,436 || 191 || 179 || 391 || 18.0 || 2.4 || 2.2 || 4.9 || align=center|
|}

C to D

|-
|align="left"| || align="center"|F/C || align="left"|Lamar || align="center"|1 || align="center"| || 51 || 327 || 110 || 6 || 110 || 6.4 || 2.2 || 0.1 || 2.2 || align=center|
|-
|align="left"| || align="center"|F || align="left"|Penn || align="center"|2 || align="center"|– || 88 || 1,362 || 248 || 104 || 386 || 15.5 || 2.8 || 1.2 || 4.4 || align=center|
|-
|align="left"| || align="center"|G || align="left"|La Salle || align="center"|2 || align="center"| || 31 || 504 || 36 || 75 || 193 || 16.3 || 1.2 || 2.4 || 6.2 || align=center|
|-
|align="left"| || align="center"|G/F || align="left"|Boston College || align="center"|1 || align="center"| || 35 || 621 || 62 || 62 || 250 || 17.7 || 1.8 || 1.8 || 7.1 || align=center|
|-
|align="left"| || align="center"|G || align="left"|Indiana || align="center"|3 || align="center"|– || 229 || 4,796 || 382 || 460 || 2,268 || 20.9 || 1.7 || 2.0 || 9.9 || align=center|
|-
|align="left"| || align="center"|G || align="left"|VMI || align="center"|1 || align="center"| || 13 || 117 || 19 || 9 || 32 || 9.0 || 1.5 || 0.7 || 2.5 || align=center|
|-
|align="left"| || align="center"|G/F || align="left"|Western Kentucky || align="center"|2 || align="center"|– || 29 || 268 || 36 || 32 || 106 || 9.2 || 1.2 || 1.1 || 3.7 || align=center|
|-
|align="left"| || align="center"|G || align="left"|California || align="center"|1 || align="center"| || 23 || 380 || 35 || 47 || 124 || 16.5 || 1.5 || 2.0 || 5.4 || align=center|
|-
|align="left"| || align="center"|F || align="left"|Syracuse || align="center"|2 || align="center"|– || 30 || 225 || 57 || 4 || 63 || 7.5 || 1.9 || 0.1 || 2.1 || align=center|
|-
|align="left"| || align="center"|G || align="left"|Rhode Island || align="center"|2 || align="center"|– || 56 || 1,106 || 136 || 194 || 466 || 19.8 || 2.4 || 3.5 || 8.3 || align=center|
|-
|align="left"| || align="center"|G || align="left"|UCLA || align="center"|4 || align="center"|–– || 284 || 8,399 || 822 || 1,517 || 3,368 || 29.6 || 2.9 || 5.3 || 11.9 || align=center|
|-
|align="left"| || align="center"|F || align="left"|Oklahoma State || align="center"|1 || align="center"| || 48 || 446 || 56 || 38 || 218 || 9.3 || 1.2 || 0.8 || 4.5 || align=center|
|-
|align="left"| || align="center"|G || align="left"|Oregon State || align="center"|1 || align="center"| || 11 || 169 || 24 || 31 || 31 || 15.4 || 2.2 || 2.8 || 2.8 || align=center|
|-
|align="left"| || align="center"|F || align="left"|Colorado || align="center"|2 || align="center"|– || 91 || 1,093 || 143 || 69 || 462 || 12.0 || 1.6 || 0.8 || 5.1 || align=center|
|-
|align="left"| || align="center"|F || align="left"|Providence || align="center"|9 || align="center"|– || 540 || 10,196 || 2,325 || 544 || 4,035 || 18.9 || 4.3 || 1.0 || 7.5 || align=center|
|-
|align="left"| || align="center"|G/F || align="left"|Georgia Southern || align="center"|1 || align="center"| || 18 || 249 || 27 || 15 || 30 || 13.8 || 1.5 || 0.8 || 1.7 || align=center|
|-
|align="left"| || align="center"|C || align="left"|Mississippi State || align="center"|1 || align="center"| || 72 || 1,052 || 294 || 43 || 370 || 14.6 || 4.1 || 0.6 || 5.1 || align=center|
|-
|align="left"| || align="center"|G/F || align="left"|Auburn || align="center"|3 || align="center"|– || 173 || 4,046 || 542 || 308 || 1,659 || 23.4 || 3.1 || 1.8 || 9.6 || align=center|
|-
|align="left" bgcolor="#FFFF99"|^ (#34) || align="center"|C || align="left"|New Mexico || align="center"|6 || align="center"|– || 479 || 17,756 || bgcolor="#CFECEC"|7,643 || 900 || 9,314 || 37.1 || bgcolor="#CFECEC"|16.0 || 1.9 || 19.4 || align=center|
|-
|align="left" bgcolor="#FFFF99"|^ || align="center"|G/F || align="left"|Notre Dame || align="center"|1 || align="center"| || 23 || 948 || 216 || 65 || 609 || bgcolor="#CFECEC"|41.2 || 9.4 || 2.8 || bgcolor="#CFECEC"|26.5 || align=center|
|-
|align="left"| || align="center"|F/C || align="left"|Michigan || align="center"|2 || align="center"| || 103 || 2,333 || 617 || 82 || 1,033 || 22.7 || 6.0 || 0.8 || 10.0 || align=center|
|-
|align="left"| || align="center"|F/C || align="left"|UTEP || align="center"|6 || align="center"|– || 420 || 10,651 || 2,788 || 282 || 3,786 || 25.4 || 6.6 || 0.7 || 9.0 || align=center|
|-
|align="left"| || align="center"|G || align="left"|Maryland || align="center"|2 || align="center"|– || 27 || 276 || 18 || 48 || 66 || 10.2 || 0.7 || 1.8 || 2.4 || align=center|
|-
|align="left" bgcolor="#FFCC00"|+ || align="center"|F/C || align="left"|Clemson || align="center"|10 || align="center"|– || 671 || 19,814 || 6,006 || 572 || 6,253 || 29.5 || 9.0 || 0.9 || 9.3 || align=center|
|-
|align="left"| || align="center"|G || align="left"|Dayton || align="center"|4 || align="center"|– || 319 || 11,083 || 765 || 1,719 || 5,234 || 34.7 || 2.4 || 5.4 || 16.4 || align=center|
|-
|align="left"| || align="center"|G || align="left"|Illinois || align="center"|1 || align="center"| || 21 || 288 || 21 || 32 || 118 || 13.7 || 1.0 || 1.5 || 5.6 || align=center|
|-
|align="left"| || align="center"|F || align="left"|St. Mary of the Plains || align="center"|1 || align="center"| || 58 || 989 || 292 || 33 || 332 || 17.1 || 5.0 || 0.6 || 5.7 || align=center|
|-
|align="left"| || align="center"|G || align="left"|Marquette || align="center"|3 || align="center"|– || 125 || 2,100 || 203 || 377 || 665 || 16.8 || 1.6 || 3.0 || 5.3 || align=center|
|-
|align="left"| || align="center"|G || align="left"|Charlotte || align="center"|1 || align="center"| || 2 || 5 || 1 || 0 || 2 || 2.5 || 0.5 || 0.0 || 1.0 || align=center|
|-
|align="left"| || align="center"|F || align="left"|Arizona State || align="center"|2 || align="center"|– || 72 || 843 || 225 || 30 || 411 || 11.7 || 3.1 || 0.4 || 5.7 || align=center|
|-
|align="left"| || align="center"|C || align="left"|Kansas || align="center"|7 || align="center"|– || 322 || 2,684 || 656 || 122 || 692 || 8.3 || 2.0 || 0.4 || 2.1 || align=center|
|-
|align="left"| || align="center"|G/F || align="left"|Duke || align="center"|5 || align="center"|– || 271 || 8,146 || 1,248 || 651 || 3,787 || 30.1 || 4.6 || 2.4 || 14.0 || align=center|
|-
|align="left"| || align="center"|G || align="left"|Georgetown || align="center"|1 || align="center"| || 82 || 1,433 || 107 || 200 || 369 || 17.5 || 1.3 || 2.4 || 4.5 || align=center|
|-
|align="left"| || align="center"|F || align="left"|BYU || align="center"|1 || align="center"| || 59 || 756 || 124 || 80 || 300 || 12.8 || 2.1 || 1.4 || 5.1 || align=center|
|}

E to F

|-
|align="left"| || align="center"|F || align="left"|Virginia || align="center"|1 || align="center"| || 10 || 143 || 26 || 10 || 11 || 14.3 || 2.6 || 1.0 || 1.1 || align=center|
|-
|align="left"| || align="center"|F || align="left"|LeMoyne–Owen || align="center"|1 || align="center"| || 77 || 1,142 || 340 || 39 || 453 || 14.8 || 4.4 || 0.5 || 5.9 || align=center|
|-
|align="left"| || align="center"|F || align="left"|Tennessee State || align="center"|2 || align="center"| || 75 || 1,350 || 378 || 29 || 580 || 18.0 || 5.0 || 0.4 || 7.7 || align=center|
|-
|align="left"| || align="center"|G || align="left"|UCLA || align="center"|1 || align="center"| || 24 || 263 || 24 || 54 || 106 || 11.0 || 1.0 || 2.3 || 4.4 || align=center|
|-
|align="left"| || align="center"|F/C || align="left"|Washington || align="center"|4 || align="center"|– || 303 || 8,917 || 2,277 || 487 || 4,811 || 29.4 || 7.5 || 1.6 || 15.9 || align=center|
|-
|align="left"| || align="center"|C || align="left"|Kent State || align="center"|1 || align="center"| || 25 || 139 || 19 || 3 || 29 || 5.6 || 0.8 || 0.1 || 1.2 || align=center|
|-
|align="left"| || align="center"|G || align="left"|Lanier HS (MS) || align="center"|2 || align="center"|– || 155 || 4,732 || 475 || 619 || 1,751 || 30.5 || 3.1 || 4.0 || 11.3 || align=center|
|-
|align="left"| || align="center"|F/C || align="left"|Maryland || align="center"|5 || align="center"|– || 308 || 6,642 || 2,051 || 314 || 2,345 || 21.6 || 6.7 || 1.0 || 7.6 || align=center|
|-
|align="left"| || align="center"|G || align="left"|North Carolina || align="center"|1 || align="center"| || 5 || 40 || 6 || 2 || 5 || 8.0 || 1.2 || 0.4 || 1.0 || align=center|
|-
|align="left" bgcolor="#FFFF99"|^ || align="center"|F || align="left"|South Carolina || align="center"|2 || align="center"|– || 135 || 4,222 || 1,035 || 413 || 2,105 || 31.3 || 7.7 || 3.1 || 15.6 || align=center|
|-
|align="left"| || align="center"|G/F || align="left"|Memphis || align="center"|1 || align="center"| || 69 || 1,402 || 201 || 166 || 706 || 20.3 || 2.9 || 2.4 || 10.2 || align=center|
|-
|align="left"| || align="center"|F || align="left"|BYU || align="center"|2 || align="center"|– || 55 || 608 || 120 || 30 || 288 || 11.1 || 2.2 || 0.5 || 5.2 || align=center|
|-
|align="left"| || align="center"|G/F || align="left"|Georgia Tech || align="center"|3 || align="center"|– || 172 || 2,313 || 322 || 127 || 827 || 13.4 || 1.9 || 0.7 || 4.8 || align=center|
|-
|align="left"| || align="center"|C || align="left"|Ukraine || align="center"|1 || align="center"| || 3 || 17 || 9 || 1 || 8 || 5.7 || 3.0 || 0.3 || 2.7 || align=center|
|-
|align="left"| || align="center"|G || align="left"|Georgia || align="center"|11 || align="center"|– || 816 || 22,974 || 2,842 || 4,038 || 9,535 || 28.2 || 3.5 || 4.9 || 11.7 || align=center|
|-
|align="left"| || align="center"|G || align="left"|Kentucky || align="center"|3 || align="center"|– || 211 || 3,376 || 437 || 454 || 1,317 || 16.0 || 2.1 || 2.2 || 6.2 || align=center|
|-
|align="left"| || align="center"|G || align="left"|Texas || align="center"|3 || align="center"|– || 162 || 4,220 || 489 || 713 || 1,813 || 26.0 || 3.0 || 4.4 || 11.2 || align=center|
|-
|align="left"| || align="center"|F/C || align="left"|Texas State || align="center"|13 || align="center"|– || 764 || 15,750 || 5,248 || 703 || 3,747 || 20.6 || 6.9 || 0.9 || 4.9 || align=center|
|-
|align="left"| || align="center"|F || align="left"|Fresno State || align="center"|1 || align="center"| || 8 || 56 || 8 || 0 || 19 || 7.0 || 1.0 || 0.0 || 2.4 || align=center|
|-
|align="left"| || align="center"|F || align="left"|Pepperdine || align="center"|1 || align="center"| || 46 || 313 || 52 || 20 || 152 || 6.8 || 1.1 || 0.4 || 3.3 || align=center|
|-
|align="left"| || align="center"|G || align="left"|Illinois || align="center"|2 || align="center"|– || 143 || 3,905 || 387 || 360 || 2,046 || 27.3 || 2.7 || 2.5 || 14.3 || align=center|
|}

G to H

|-
|align="left"| || align="center"|F || align="left"|Wyoming || align="center"|2 || align="center"|– || 145 || 2,320 || 561 || 162 || 758 || 16.0 || 3.9 || 1.1 || 5.2 || align=center|
|-
|align="left" bgcolor="#FFCC00"|+ || align="center"|F || align="left"|Fresno State || align="center"|7 || align="center"|– || 448 || 14,692 || 2,816 || 1,419 || 8,090 || 32.8 || 6.3 || 3.2 || 18.1 || align=center|
|-
|align="left"| || align="center"|G || align="left"|Weber State || align="center"|2 || align="center"|– || 114 || 1,143 || 127 || 95 || 314 || 10.0 || 1.1 || 0.8 || 2.8 || align=center|
|-
|align="left"| || align="center"|G || align="left"|Oklahoma State || align="center"|2 || align="center"|– || 74 || 812 || 118 || 42 || 369 || 11.0 || 1.6 || 0.6 || 5.0 || align=center|
|-
|align="left" bgcolor="#FFCC00"|+ || align="center"|F || align="left"|New Mexico || align="center"|9 || align="center"|– || 544 || 17,680 || 2,780 || 1,072 || 9,571 || 32.5 || 5.1 || 2.0 || 17.6 || align=center|
|-
|align="left"| || align="center"|F || align="left"|Kentucky State || align="center"|1 || align="center"| || 34 || 567 || 101 || 31 || 326 || 16.7 || 3.0 || 0.9 || 9.6 || align=center|
|-
|align="left"| || align="center"|F/C || align="left"|UCLA || align="center"|5 || align="center"|– || 320 || 2,860 || 865 || 129 || 779 || 8.9 || 2.7 || 0.4 || 2.4 || align=center|
|-
|align="left"| || align="center"|G/F || align="left"|Gulf Shores Academy (TX) || align="center"|1 || align="center"| || 60 || 1,080 || 141 || 50 || 421 || 18.0 || 2.4 || 0.8 || 7.0 || align=center|
|-
|align="left"| || align="center"|G || align="left"|Michigan || align="center"|1 || align="center"| || 69 || 927 || 54 || 182 || 244 || 13.4 || 0.8 || 2.6 || 3.5 || align=center|
|-
|align="left"| || align="center"|G/F || align="left"|Iona || align="center"|2 || align="center"|– || 48 || 337 || 51 || 29 || 203 || 7.0 || 1.1 || 0.6 || 4.2 || align=center|
|-
|align="left"| || align="center"|F || align="left"|Indiana || align="center"|3 || align="center"|– || 153 || 1,632 || 300 || 97 || 705 || 10.7 || 2.0 || 0.6 || 4.6 || align=center|
|-
|align="left"| || align="center"|G || align="left"|Louisiana || align="center"|1 || align="center"| || 41 || 254 || 44 || 22 || 63 || 6.2 || 1.1 || 0.5 || 1.5 || align=center|
|-
|align="left"| || align="center"|G || align="left"|North Carolina || align="center"|1 || align="center"| || 2 || 8 || 0 || 1 || 4 || 4.0 || 0.0 || 0.5 || 2.0 || align=center|
|-
|align="left"| || align="center"|F || align="left"|Syracuse || align="center"|1 || align="center"| || 5 || 38 || 10 || 3 || 12 || 7.6 || 2.0 || 0.6 || 2.4 || align=center|
|-
|align="left"| || align="center"|F || align="left"|Tennessee || align="center"|1 || align="center"| || 9 || 106 || 15 || 3 || 32 || 11.8 || 1.7 || 0.3 || 3.6 || align=center|
|-
|align="left"| || align="center"|F || align="left"|Texas Tech || align="center"|1 || align="center"| || 1 || 5 || 0 || 0 || 3 || 5.0 || 0.0 || 0.0 || 3.0 || align=center|
|-
|align="left"| || align="center"|G || align="left"|Notre Dame || align="center"|1 || align="center"| || 28 || 200 || 18 || 21 || 57 || 7.1 || 0.6 || 0.8 || 2.0 || align=center|
|-
|align="left"| || align="center"|F || align="left"|North Carolina || align="center"|4 || align="center"|– || 246 || 4,854 || 1,167 || 135 || 2,195 || 19.7 || 4.7 || 0.5 || 8.9 || align=center|
|-
|align="left"| || align="center"|G || align="left"|UTEP || align="center"|1 || align="center"| || 10 || 127 || 15 || 24 || 49 || 12.7 || 1.5 || 2.4 || 4.9 || align=center|
|-
|align="left"| || align="center"|C || align="left"|Martin Luther King HS (MI) || align="center"|1 || align="center"| || 25 || 840 || 334 || 53 || 336 || 33.6 || 13.4 || 2.1 || 13.4 || align=center|
|-
|align="left"| || align="center"|G || align="left"|Loyola (IL) || align="center"|2 || align="center"|– || 81 || 1,513 || 227 || 150 || 589 || 18.7 || 2.8 || 1.9 || 7.3 || align=center|
|-
|align="left"| || align="center"|F || align="left"|St. Patrick HS (NJ) || align="center"|7 || align="center"|– || 390 || 10,335 || 2,100 || 534 || 4,157 || 26.5 || 5.4 || 1.4 || 10.7 || align=center|
|-
|align="left"| || align="center"|C || align="left"|Colorado || align="center"|4 || align="center"|– || 189 || 2,686 || 549 || 47 || 949 || 14.2 || 2.9 || 0.2 || 5.0 || align=center|
|-
|align="left"| || align="center"|F/C || align="left"|Oregon State || align="center"|1 || align="center"| || 27 || 186 || 55 || 6 || 55 || 6.9 || 2.0 || 0.2 || 2.0 || align=center|
|-
|align="left"| || align="center"|G || align="left"|Providence || align="center"|1 || align="center"| || 74 || 1,135 || 94 || 104 || 523 || 15.3 || 1.3 || 1.4 || 7.1 || align=center|
|-
|align="left"| || align="center"|G || align="left"|Illinois || align="center"|1 || align="center"| || 47 || 813 || 80 || 72 || 357 || 17.3 || 1.7 || 1.5 || 7.6 || align=center|
|-
|align="left" bgcolor="#FFCC00"|+ || align="center"|C || align="left"|Georgetown || align="center"|7 || align="center"|– || 533 || 13,829 || 3,623 || 769 || 5,909 || 25.9 || 6.8 || 1.4 || 11.1 || align=center|
|-
|align="left"| || align="center"|F || align="left"|Eastern Michigan || align="center"|1 || align="center"| || 53 || 467 || 128 || 35 || 231 || 8.8 || 2.4 || 0.7 || 4.4 || align=center|
|-
|align="left"| || align="center"|G || align="left"|IUPUI || align="center"|5 || align="center"|– || 319 || 10,119 || 1,195 || 1,244 || 3,924 || 31.7 || 3.7 || 3.9 || 12.3 || align=center|
|-
|align="left"| || align="center"|F/C || align="left"|Arizona || align="center"|1 || align="center"| || 73 || 1,513 || 451 || 87 || 645 || 20.7 || 6.2 || 1.2 || 8.8 || align=center|
|-
|align="left"| || align="center"|F || align="left"|Arizona || align="center"|3 || align="center"|– || 169 || 3,473 || 521 || 253 || 1,022 || 20.6 || 3.1 || 1.5 || 6.0 || align=center|
|-
|align="left"| || align="center"|F/C || align="left"|San Jose State || align="center"|6 || align="center"|– || 477 || 13,317 || 3,999 || 717 || 5,074 || 27.9 || 8.4 || 1.5 || 10.6 || align=center|
|-
|align="left"| || align="center"|G || align="left"|Iowa State || align="center"|4 || align="center"|– || 139 || 1,618 || 224 || 98 || 536 || 11.6 || 1.6 || 0.7 || 3.9 || align=center|
|-
|align="left" bgcolor="#CCFFCC"|x || align="center"|G || align="left"|UCLA || align="center"|1 || align="center"| || 50 || 646 || 67 || 87 || 294 || 12.9 || 1.3 || 1.7 || 5.9 || align=center|
|-
|align="left"| || align="center"|G || align="left"|Dayton || align="center"|1 || align="center"| || 54 || 955 || 109 || 142 || 271 || 17.7 || 2.0 || 2.6 || 5.0 || align=center|
|}

J

|-
|align="left"| || align="center"|G/F || align="left"|Wichita State || align="center"|1 || align="center"| || 62 || 1,586 || 298 || 214 || 682 || 25.6 || 4.8 || 3.5 || 11.0 || align=center|
|-
|align="left"| || align="center"|G || align="left"|Georgia Tech || align="center"|1 || align="center"| || 82 || 2,716 || 276 || 338 || 1,074 || 33.1 || 3.4 || 4.1 || 13.1 || align=center|
|-
|align="left"| || align="center"|G || align="left"|St. John's || align="center"|6 || align="center"|– || 405 || 12,083 || 1,539 || 3,294 || 3,412 || 29.8 || 3.8 || bgcolor="#CFECEC"|8.1 || 8.4 || align=center|
|-
|align="left"| || align="center"|G || align="left"|UCLA || align="center"|1 || align="center"| || 1 || 12 || 1 || 4 || 2 || 12.0 || 1.0 || 4.0 || 2.0 || align=center|
|-
|align="left"| || align="center"|G/F || align="left"|Butler CC || align="center"|3 || align="center"|– || 169 || 5,902 || 657 || 458 || 2,803 || 34.9 || 3.9 || 2.7 || 16.6 || align=center|
|-
|align="left"| || align="center"|G/F || align="left"|Notre Dame || align="center"|1 || align="center"| || 2 || 10 || 1 || 0 || 6 || 5.0 || 0.5 || 0.0 || 3.0 || align=center|
|-
|align="left"| || align="center"|G || align="left"|Maryland || align="center"|2 || align="center"|– || 112 || 2,221 || 201 || 338 || 820 || 19.8 || 1.8 || 3.0 || 7.3 || align=center|
|-
|align="left"| || align="center"|F/C || align="left"|Prentiss HS (MS) || align="center"|2 || align="center"|– || 102 || 1,415 || 421 || 87 || 787 || 13.9 || 4.1 || 0.9 || 7.7 || align=center|
|-
|align="left"| || align="center"|F || align="left"|Utah || align="center"|1 || align="center"| || 6 || 87 || 10 || 4 || 12 || 14.5 || 1.7 || 0.7 || 2.0 || align=center|
|-
|align="left" bgcolor="#CCFFCC"|x || align="center"|F || align="left"|Missouri State || align="center"|1 || align="center"| || 14 || 64 || 19 || 1 || 13 || 4.6 || 1.4 || 0.1 || 0.9 || align=center|
|-
|align="left"| || align="center"|G || align="left"|College of Charleston || align="center"|3 || align="center"|– || 211 || 5,326 || 477 || 828 || 1,673 || 25.2 || 2.3 || 3.9 || 7.9 || align=center|
|-
|align="left"| || align="center"|F/C || align="left"|Florida A&M || align="center"|4 || align="center"|– || 290 || 6,379 || 1,752 || 501 || 2,294 || 22.0 || 6.0 || 1.7 || 7.9 || align=center|
|-
|align="left"| || align="center"|G/F || align="left"|Illinois || align="center"|2 || align="center"|– || 90 || 1,308 || 193 || 86 || 622 || 14.5 || 2.1 || 1.0 || 6.9 || align=center|
|-
|align="left"| || align="center"|F/C || align="left"|St. John's || align="center"|4 || align="center"|– || 265 || 6,020 || 1,500 || 541 || 2,764 || 22.7 || 5.7 || 2.0 || 10.4 || align=center|
|-
|align="left" bgcolor="#FFFF99"|^ || align="center"|F/C || align="left"|Idaho || align="center"|1 || align="center"| || 50 || 753 || 245 || 62 || 299 || 15.1 || 4.9 || 1.2 || 6.0 || align=center|
|-
|align="left"| || align="center"|F || align="left"|Aurora || align="center"|1 || align="center"| || 82 || 2,647 || 681 || 344 || 1,566 || 32.3 || 8.3 || 4.2 || 19.1 || align=center|
|-
|align="left"| || align="center"|G || align="left"|UC Santa Barbara || align="center"|2 || align="center"|– || 89 || 961 || 161 || 63 || 294 || 10.8 || 1.8 || 0.7 || 3.3 || align=center|
|-
|align="left"| || align="center"|G/F || align="left"|Duke || align="center"|3 || align="center"|– || 186 || 3,533 || 411 || 246 || 1,405 || 19.0 || 2.2 || 1.3 || 7.6 || align=center|
|-
|align="left"| || align="center"|G/F || align="left"|Oregon || align="center"|4 || align="center"|– || 245 || 5,728 || 547 || 528 || 1,884 || 23.4 || 2.2 || 2.2 || 7.7 || align=center|
|-
|align="left"| || align="center"|G/F || align="left"|Miami (FL) || align="center"|2 || align="center"|– || 81 || 1,356 || 176 || 57 || 378 || 16.7 || 2.2 || 0.7 || 4.7 || align=center|
|-
|align="left"| || align="center"|F || align="left"|South Florida || align="center"|2 || align="center"|– || 91 || 1,203 || 257 || 62 || 346 || 13.2 || 2.8 || 0.7 || 3.8 || align=center|
|-
|align="left"| || align="center"|F || align="left"|Albany State || align="center"|1 || align="center"| || 80 || 2,709 || 604 || 189 || 1,042 || 33.9 || 7.6 || 2.4 || 13.0 || align=center|
|-
|align="left"| || align="center"|F || align="left"|Canisius || align="center"|1 || align="center"| || 71 || 855 || 216 || 53 || 369 || 12.0 || 3.0 || 0.7 || 5.2 || align=center|
|-
|align="left"| || align="center"|G || align="left"|Texas || align="center"|2 || align="center"|– || 164 || 4,273 || 542 || 581 || 1,186 || 26.1 || 3.3 || 3.5 || 7.2 || align=center|
|-
|align="left"| || align="center"|G || align="left"|South Carolina || align="center"|2 || align="center"|– || 137 || 3,815 || 255 || 450 || 1,621 || 27.8 || 1.9 || 3.3 || 11.8 || align=center|
|-
|align="left"| || align="center"|F || align="left"|Indiana || align="center"|1 || align="center"| || 2 || 5 || 1 || 0 || 0 || 2.5 || 0.5 || 0.0 || 0.0 || align=center|
|}

K to M

|-
|align="left"| || align="center"|G || align="left"|Purdue || align="center"|7 || align="center"|– || 556 || 13,609 || 1,349 || 1,980 || 6,588 || 24.5 || 2.4 || 3.6 || 11.8 || align=center|
|-
|align="left"| || align="center"|F || align="left"|Ohio State || align="center"|5 || align="center"|– || 260 || 8,514 || 2,482 || 764 || 4,918 || 32.7 || 9.5 || 2.9 || 18.9 || align=center|
|-
|align="left"| || align="center"|G || align="left"|Lincoln (MO) || align="center"|1 || align="center"| || 4 || 41 || 7 || 2 || 6 || 10.3 || 1.8 || 0.5 || 1.5 || align=center|
|-
|align="left"| || align="center"|F || align="left"|Michigan State || align="center"|1 || align="center"| || 10 || 114 || 19 || 13 || 62 || 11.4 || 1.9 || 1.3 || 6.2 || align=center|
|-
|align="left"| || align="center"|F/C || align="left"|UMass || align="center"|1 || align="center"| || 3 || 7 || 0 || 1 || 0 || 2.3 || 0.0 || 0.3 || 0.0 || align=center|
|-
|align="left"| || align="center"|C || align="left"|BYU || align="center"|1 || align="center"| || 9 || 61 || 18 || 1 || 8 || 6.8 || 2.0 || 0.1 || 0.9 || align=center|
|-
|align="left" bgcolor="#FFCC00"|+ || align="center"|G/F || align="left"|Pittsburgh || align="center"|8 || align="center"|–– || 585 || 17,787 || 3,448 || 1,395 || 10,780 || 30.4 || 5.9 || 2.4 || 18.4 || align=center|
|-
|align="left"| || align="center"|F || align="left"|Northwestern || align="center"|1 || align="center"| || 37 || 354 || 69 || 14 || 109 || 9.6 || 1.9 || 0.4 || 2.9 || align=center|
|-
|align="left"| || align="center"|F || align="left"|UConn || align="center"|1 || align="center"| || 5 || 51 || 9 || 2 || 14 || 10.2 || 1.8 || 0.4 || 2.8 || align=center|
|-
|align="left"| || align="center"|G || align="left"|North Carolina || align="center"|1 || align="center"| || 24 || 100 || 14 || 16 || 29 || 4.2 || 0.6 || 0.7 || 1.2 || align=center|
|-
|align="left"| || align="center"|G || align="left"|Louisiana || align="center"|1 || align="center"| || 35 || 908 || 98 || 135 || 547 || 25.9 || 2.8 || 3.9 || 15.6 || align=center|
|-
|align="left"| || align="center"|F || align="left"|Pittsburgh || align="center"|1 || align="center"| || 3 || 30 || 18 || 4 || 6 || 10.0 || 6.0 || 1.3 || 2.0 || align=center|
|-
|align="left"| || align="center"|G || align="left"|North Carolina || align="center"|1 || align="center"| || 13 || 235 || 31 || 57 || 64 || 18.1 || 2.4 || 4.4 || 4.9 || align=center|
|-
|align="left" bgcolor="#CCFFCC"|x || align="center"|F || align="left"|UCLA || align="center"|2 || align="center"|– || 111 || 981 || 207 || 33 || 381 || 8.8 || 1.9 || 0.3 || 3.4 || align=center|
|-
|align="left"| || align="center"|G || align="left"|Arizona State || align="center"|8 || align="center"|– || 575 || 19,534 || 2,230 || 2,279 || 9,257 || 34.0 || 3.9 || 4.0 || 16.1 || align=center|
|-
|align="left"| || align="center"|F/C || align="left"|Duke || align="center"|1 || align="center"| || 24 || 457 || 181 || 29 || 197 || 19.0 || 7.5 || 1.2 || 8.2 || align=center|
|-
|align="left"| || align="center"|G/F || align="left"|Detroit Mercy || align="center"|3 || align="center"|– || 205 || 5,054 || 512 || 496 || 2,575 || 24.7 || 2.5 || 2.4 || 12.6 || align=center|
|-
|align="left"| || align="center"|G || align="left"|NC State || align="center"|1 || align="center"| || 78 || 1,238 || 122 || 269 || 324 || 15.9 || 1.6 || 3.4 || 4.2 || align=center|
|-
|align="left"| || align="center"|G || align="left"|Kentucky || align="center"|1 || align="center"| || 76 || 1,250 || 113 || 197 || 376 || 16.4 || 1.5 || 2.6 || 4.9 || align=center|
|-
|align="left"| || align="center"|C || align="left"|France || align="center"|4 || align="center"|– || 289 || 5,532 || 1,431 || 188 || 1,599 || 19.1 || 5.0 || 0.7 || 5.5 || align=center|
|-
|align="left"| || align="center"|F || align="left"|Jackson State || align="center"|1 || align="center"| || 12 || 134 || 37 || 14 || 60 || 11.2 || 3.1 || 1.2 || 5.0 || align=center|
|-
|align="left"| || align="center"|G/F || align="left"|Oakland || align="center"|1 || align="center"| || 40 || 361 || 29 || 13 || 99 || 9.0 || 0.7 || 0.3 || 2.5 || align=center|
|-
|align="left"| || align="center"|F || align="left"|Georgetown || align="center"|1 || align="center"| || 66 || 691 || 102 || 52 || 332 || 10.5 || 1.5 || 0.8 || 5.0 || align=center|
|-
|align="left"| || align="center"|G || align="left"|Marquette || align="center"|1 || align="center"| || 23 || 725 || 65 || 55 || 251 || 31.5 || 2.8 || 2.4 || 10.9 || align=center|
|-
|align="left"| || align="center"|F || align="left"|Furman || align="center"|1 || align="center"| || 2 || 21 || 7 || 3 || 7 || 10.5 || 3.5 || 1.5 || 3.5 || align=center|
|-
|align="left"| || align="center"|G || align="left"|Villanova || align="center"|1 || align="center"| || 45 || 461 || 30 || 67 || 157 || 10.2 || 0.7 || 1.5 || 3.5 || align=center|
|-
|align="left"| || align="center"|G/F || align="left"|Florida State || align="center"|4 || align="center"|– || 247 || 3,875 || 497 || 503 || 1,364 || 15.7 || 2.0 || 2.0 || 5.5 || align=center|
|-
|align="left" bgcolor="#CCFFCC"|x || align="center"|F || align="left"|Creighton || align="center"|1 || align="center"| || 77 || 1,340 || 109 || 67 || 564 || 17.4 || 1.4 || 0.9 || 7.3 || align=center|
|-
|align="left" bgcolor="#FFFF99"|^ (#30) || align="center"|F/C || align="left"|Indiana || align="center"|7 || align="center"|–– || 487 || 15,955 || 5,219 || 1,630 || 9,545 || 32.8 || 10.7 || 3.3 || 19.6 || align=center|
|-
|align="left"| || align="center"|F || align="left"|Fresno State || align="center"|1 || align="center"| || 2 || 12 || 2 || 1 || 0 || 6.0 || 1.0 || 0.5 || 0.0 || align=center|
|-
|align="left"| || align="center"|G || align="left"|Ohio || align="center"|1 || align="center"| || 1 || 3 || 0 || 0 || 0 || 3.0 || 0.0 || 0.0 || 0.0 || align=center|
|-
|align="left"| || align="center"|G/F || align="left"|Creighton || align="center"|1 || align="center"| || 61 || 923 || 95 || 114 || 387 || 15.1 || 1.6 || 1.9 || 6.3 || align=center|
|-
|align="left"| || align="center"|F/C || align="left"|Alabama || align="center"|8 || align="center"|– || 450 || 12,488 || 1,961 || 1,210 || 3,968 || 27.8 || 4.4 || 2.7 || 8.8 || align=center|
|-
|align="left"| || align="center"|G || align="left"|Miami (FL) || align="center"|1 || align="center"| || 1 || 1 || 0 || 0 || 0 || 1.0 || 0.0 || 0.0 || 0.0 || align=center|
|-
|align="left"| || align="center"|G || align="left"|Bowling Green || align="center"|1 || align="center"| || 22 || 339 || 22 || 45 || 93 || 15.4 || 1.0 || 2.0 || 4.2 || align=center|
|-
|align="left"| || align="center"|F || align="left"|Duke || align="center"|3 || align="center"|– || 147 || 2,400 || 583 || 210 || 792 || 16.3 || 4.0 || 1.4 || 5.4 || align=center|
|-
|align="left"| || align="center"|G/F || align="left"|Kentucky || align="center"|2 || align="center"|– || 85 || 1,884 || 177 || 122 || 618 || 22.2 || 2.1 || 1.4 || 7.3 || align=center|
|-
|align="left"| || align="center"|G/F || align="left"|Skyline HS (TX) || align="center"|3 || align="center"|– || 210 || 5,081 || 618 || 186 || 2,510 || 24.2 || 2.9 || 0.9 || 12.0 || align=center|
|-
|align="left" bgcolor="#FFCC00"|+ || align="center"|C || align="left"|Purdue || align="center"|2 || align="center"|– || 101 || 3,142 || 823 || 244 || 1,379 || 31.1 || 8.1 || 2.4 || 13.7 || align=center|
|-
|align="left"| || align="center"|F || align="left"|Toledo || align="center"|1 || align="center"| || 5 || 34 || 4 || 4 || 4 || 6.8 || 0.8 || 0.8 || 0.8 || align=center|
|-
|align="left"| || align="center"|F || align="left"|Notre Dame || align="center"|3 || align="center"|– || 95 || 918 || 164 || 37 || 482 || 9.7 || 1.7 || 0.4 || 5.1 || align=center|
|-
|align="left" bgcolor="#FFFF99"|^ (#31) || align="center"|G/F || align="left"|UCLA || align="center" bgcolor="#CFECEC|18 || align="center"|– || bgcolor="#CFECEC"|1,389 || bgcolor="#CFECEC"|47,619 || 4,182 || bgcolor="#CFECEC"|4,141 || bgcolor="#CFECEC"|25,279 || 34.3 || 3.0 || 3.0 || 18.2 || align=center|
|-
|align="left"| || align="center"|F || align="left"|Michigan || align="center"|1 || align="center"| || 14 || 113 || 21 || 5 || 25 || 8.1 || 1.5 || 0.4 || 1.8 || align=center|
|-
|align="left"| || align="center"|F || align="left"|Mercer || align="center"|3 || align="center"|– || 237 || 3,863 || 681 || 202 || 1,475 || 16.3 || 2.9 || 0.9 || 6.2 || align=center|
|-
|align="left"| || align="center"|F || align="left"|SMU || align="center"|1 || align="center"| || 2 || 9 || 1 || 1 || 0 || 4.5 || 0.5 || 0.5 || 0.0 || align=center|
|-
|align="left"| || align="center"|G || align="left"|Wake Forest || align="center"|1 || align="center"| || 8 || 46 || 17 || 7 || 15 || 5.8 || 2.1 || 0.9 || 1.9 || align=center|
|-
|align="left"| || align="center"|G || align="left"|Cal State Fullerton || align="center"|1 || align="center"| || 2 || 11 || 0 || 1 || 6 || 5.5 || 0.0 || 0.5 || 3.0 || align=center|
|-
|align="left"| || align="center"|G || align="left"|Purdue || align="center"|2 || align="center"|– || 144 || 2,958 || 226 || 337 || 1,550 || 20.5 || 1.6 || 2.3 || 10.8 || align=center|
|-
|align="left" bgcolor="#FFFF99"|^ || align="center"|G/F || align="left"|St. John's || align="center"|3 || align="center"|– || 179 || 3,938 || 485 || 304 || 1,676 || 22.0 || 2.7 || 1.7 || 9.4 || align=center|
|-
|align="left"| || align="center"|F/C || align="left"|Notre Dame || align="center"|4 || align="center"|– || 262 || 8,117 || 2,398 || 553 || 3,474 || 31.0 || 9.2 || 2.1 || 13.3 || align=center|
|-
|align="left"| || align="center"|G || align="left"|Shaw || align="center"|1 || align="center"| || 23 || 527 || 47 || 80 || 254 || 22.9 || 2.0 || 3.5 || 11.0 || align=center|
|}

N to P

|-
|align="left"| || align="center"|F || align="left"|Louisiana-Monroe || align="center"|1 || align="center"| || 14 || 164 || 35 || 9 || 57 || 11.7 || 2.5 || 0.6 || 4.1 || align=center|
|-
|align="left"| || align="center"|G || align="left"|Louisiana-Monroe || align="center"|1 || align="center"| || 19 || 149 || 15 || 10 || 59 || 7.8 || 0.8 || 0.5 || 3.1 || align=center|
|-
|align="left"| || align="center"|C || align="left"|Slovenia || align="center"|1 || align="center"| || 70 || 1,214 || 240 || 109 || 473 || 17.3 || 3.4 || 1.6 || 6.8 || align=center|
|-
|align="left"| || align="center"|F/C || align="left"|Drake || align="center"|8 || align="center"|–– || 515 || 16,657 || 4,566 || 565 || 8,078 || 32.3 || 8.9 || 1.1 || 15.7 || align=center|
|-
|align="left"| || align="center"|G/F || align="left"|Ole Miss || align="center"|2 || align="center"| || 68 || 1,051 || 92 || 150 || 481 || 15.5 || 1.4 || 2.2 || 7.1 || align=center|
|-
|align="left"| || align="center"|C || align="left"|LSU || align="center"|2 || align="center"|– || 35 || 190 || 65 || 14 || 73 || 5.4 || 1.9 || 0.4 || 2.1 || align=center|
|-
|align="left"| || align="center"|F || align="left"|Iowa State || align="center"|1 || align="center"| || 23 || 93 || 17 || 5 || 21 || 4.0 || 0.7 || 0.2 || 0.9 || align=center|
|-
|align="left"| || align="center"|F || align="left"|Tennessee || align="center"|1 || align="center"| || 20 || 109 || 26 || 5 || 39 || 5.5 || 1.3 || 0.3 || 2.0 || align=center|
|-
|align="left" bgcolor="#FBCEB1"|* || align="center"|G || align="left"|Indiana || align="center"|2 || align="center"|– || 111 || 3,699 || 592 || 509 || 2,410 || 33.3 || 5.3 || 4.6 || 21.7 || align=center|
|-
|align="left"| || align="center"|C || align="left"|Seattle || align="center"|1 || align="center"| || 4 || 19 || 3 || 0 || 6 || 4.8 || 0.8 || 0.0 || 1.5 || align=center|
|-
|align="left"| || align="center"|G || align="left"|UConn || align="center"|1 || align="center"| || 29 || 577 || 56 || 98 || 158 || 19.9 || 1.9 || 3.4 || 5.4 || align=center|
|-
|align="left" bgcolor="#FFCC00"|+ || align="center"|F/C || align="left"|Eau Claire HS (SC) || align="center"|8 || align="center"|– || 514 || 17,997 || 4,933 || 1,010 || 9,580 || 35.0 || 9.6 || 2.0 || 18.6 || align=center|
|-
|align="left"| || align="center"|F/C || align="left"|Norfolk State || align="center"|1 || align="center"| || 45 || 371 || 119 || 56 || 156 || 8.2 || 2.6 || 1.2 || 3.5 || align=center|
|-
|align="left"| || align="center"|G || align="left"|Saint Louis || align="center"|1 || align="center"| || 9 || 143 || 37 || 13 || 51 || 15.9 || 4.1 || 1.4 || 5.7 || align=center|
|-
|align="left"| || align="center"|F || align="left"|Syracuse || align="center"|2 || align="center"|– || 162 || 3,738 || 692 || 266 || 1,777 || 23.1 || 4.3 || 1.6 || 11.0 || align=center|
|-
|align="left"| || align="center"|G || align="left"|Houston || align="center"|1 || align="center"| || 31 || 392 || 47 || 47 || 123 || 12.6 || 1.5 || 1.5 || 4.0 || align=center|
|-
|align="left"| || align="center"|F/C || align="left"|South Carolina || align="center"|2 || align="center"| || 90 || 1,842 || 441 || 136 || 884 || 20.5 || 4.9 || 1.5 || 9.8 || align=center|
|-
|align="left"| || align="center"|G || align="left"|Tennessee Tech || align="center"|1 || align="center"| || 21 || 189 || 20 || 13 || 61 || 9.0 || 1.0 || 0.6 || 2.9 || align=center|
|-
|align="left"| || align="center"|G/F || align="left"|UNLV || align="center"|1 || align="center"| || 7 || 55 || 5 || 4 || 19 || 7.9 || 0.7 || 0.6 || 2.7 || align=center|
|-
|align="left"| || align="center"|F/C || align="left"|Iowa || align="center"|3 || align="center"|– || 138 || 2,370 || 751 || 66 || 750 || 17.2 || 5.4 || 0.5 || 5.4 || align=center|
|-
|align="left"| || align="center"|F || align="left"|Arizona State || align="center"|2 || align="center"|– || 57 || 475 || 137 || 19 || 179 || 8.3 || 2.4 || 0.3 || 3.1 || align=center|
|-
|align="left"| || align="center"|F/C || align="left"|North Carolina || align="center"|3 || align="center"|– || 193 || 3,408 || 595 || 134 || 1,017 || 17.7 || 3.1 || 0.7 || 5.3 || align=center|
|-
|align="left"| || align="center"|G || align="left"|Virginia Tech || align="center"|1 || align="center"| || 27 || 865 || 73 || 97 || 365 || 32.0 || 2.7 || 3.6 || 13.5 || align=center|
|-
|align="left"| || align="center"|F || align="left"|Auburn || align="center"|6 || align="center"|– || 479 || 16,978 || 3,017 || 1,743 || 9,096 || 35.4 || 6.3 || 3.6 || 19.0 || align=center|
|-
|align="left"| || align="center"|G || align="left"|Rice || align="center"|1 || align="center"| || 76 || 1,404 || 136 || 101 || 737 || 18.5 || 1.8 || 1.3 || 9.7 || align=center|
|-
|align="left"| || align="center"|F/C || align="left"|Duke || align="center"|1 || align="center"| || 14 || 55 || 22 || 2 || 13 || 3.9 || 1.6 || 0.1 || 0.9 || align=center|
|-
|align="left"| || align="center"|C || align="left"|Kansas || align="center"|3 || align="center"|– || 155 || 2,314 || 587 || 52 || 466 || 14.9 || 3.8 || 0.3 || 3.0 || align=center|
|-
|align="left"| || align="center"|F || align="left"|Kentucky || align="center"|2 || align="center"|– || 32 || 219 || 30 || 7 || 41 || 6.8 || 0.9 || 0.2 || 1.3 || align=center|
|-
|align="left"| || align="center"|G/F || align="left"|Xavier || align="center"|1 || align="center"| || 49 || 839 || 147 || 34 || 240 || 17.1 || 3.0 || 0.7 || 4.9 || align=center|
|-
|align="left"| || align="center"|F || align="left"|NC State || align="center"|1 || align="center"| || 7 || 64 || 19 || 3 || 12 || 9.1 || 2.7 || 0.4 || 1.7 || align=center|
|-
|align="left"| || align="center"|F || align="left"|Kentucky || align="center"|1 || align="center"| || 25 || 104 || 17 || 2 || 26 || 4.2 || 0.7 || 0.1 || 1.0 || align=center|
|-
|align="left"| || align="center"|G || align="left"|UConn || align="center"|4 || align="center"|– || 160 || 2,421 || 235 || 330 || 1,010 || 15.1 || 1.5 || 2.1 || 6.3 || align=center|
|-
|align="left"| || align="center"|G || align="left"|Illinois || align="center"|1 || align="center"| || 4 || 25 || 5 || 1 || 6 || 6.3 || 1.3 || 0.3 || 1.5 || align=center|
|}

R to S

|-
|align="left"| || align="center"|G || align="left"|Indiana || align="center"|1 || align="center"| || 52 || 649 || 68 || 57 || 202 || 12.5 || 1.3 || 1.1 || 3.9 || align=center|
|-
|align="left"| || align="center"|G || align="left"|Indiana || align="center"|2 || align="center"|– || 101 || 2,760 || 305 || 273 || 1,125 || 27.3 || 3.0 || 2.7 || 11.1 || align=center|
|-
|align="left"| || align="center"|C || align="left"|BYU || align="center"|1 || align="center"| || 6 || 33 || 10 || 1 || 5 || 5.5 || 1.7 || 0.2 || 0.8 || align=center|
|-
|align="left"| || align="center"|G || align="left"|Miami (FL) || align="center"|1 || align="center"| || 10 || 47 || 6 || 3 || 12 || 4.7 || 0.6 || 0.3 || 1.2 || align=center|
|-
|align="left"| || align="center"|G || align="left"|Seattle || align="center"|2 || align="center"|– || 160 || 3,620 || 394 || 613 || 1,295 || 22.6 || 2.5 || 3.8 || 8.1 || align=center|
|-
|align="left"| || align="center"|G || align="left"|Hofstra || align="center"|1 || align="center"| || 3 || 4 || 1 || 1 || 0 || 1.3 || 0.3 || 0.3 || 0.0 || align=center|
|-
|align="left"| || align="center"|G || align="left"|UCLA || align="center"|2 || align="center"|– || 111 || 3,418 || 377 || 810 || 1,139 || 30.8 || 3.4 || 7.3 || 10.3 || align=center|
|-
|align="left"| || align="center"|F/C || align="left"|Kentucky || align="center"|1 || align="center"| || 43 || 849 || 254 || 53 || 370 || 19.7 || 5.9 || 1.2 || 8.6 || align=center|
|-
|align="left"| || align="center"|G/F || align="left"|Michigan || align="center"|3 || align="center"|– || 137 || 2,273 || 351 || 90 || 685 || 16.6 || 2.6 || 0.7 || 5.0 || align=center|
|-
|align="left"| || align="center"|F/C || align="left"|Kansas || align="center"|3 || align="center"|– || 179 || 4,979 || 1,399 || 351 || 2,162 || 27.8 || 7.8 || 2.0 || 12.1 || align=center|
|-
|align="left"| || align="center"|F/C || align="left"|Tennessee State || align="center"|1 || align="center"| || 22 || 168 || 38 || 3 || 59 || 7.6 || 1.7 || 0.1 || 2.7 || align=center|
|-
|align="left"| || align="center"|G/F || align="left"|Michigan || align="center"|6 || align="center"|– || 402 || 11,990 || 1,465 || 1,355 || 5,712 || 29.8 || 3.6 || 3.4 || 14.2 || align=center|
|-
|align="left"| || align="center"|F/C || align="left"|Central Michigan || align="center"|3 || align="center"|– || 207 || 4,835 || 1,579 || 300 || 2,247 || 23.4 || 7.6 || 1.4 || 10.9 || align=center|
|-
|align="left"| || align="center"|F || align="left"|UNC Wilmington || align="center"|1 || align="center"| || 4 || 16 || 5 || 1 || 6 || 4.0 || 1.3 || 0.3 || 1.5 || align=center|
|-
|align="left"| || align="center"|F || align="left"|Croatia || align="center"|1 || align="center"| || 68 || 1,047 || 47 || 53 || 323 || 15.4 || 0.7 || 0.8 || 4.8 || align=center|
|-
|align="left"| || align="center"|G/F || align="left"|Kansas || align="center"|3 || align="center"|– || 224 || 6,048 || 796 || 240 || 1,991 || 27.0 || 3.6 || 1.1 || 8.9 || align=center|
|-
|align="left"| || align="center"|G || align="left"|Missouri || align="center"|1 || align="center"| || 71 || 1,504 || 168 || 89 || 588 || 21.2 || 2.4 || 1.3 || 8.3 || align=center|
|-
|align="left"| || align="center"|G || align="left"|Western Michigan || align="center"|1 || align="center"| || 48 || 511 || 55 || 129 || 157 || 10.6 || 1.1 || 2.7 || 3.3 || align=center|
|-
|align="left" bgcolor="#CCFFCC"|x || align="center"|F/C || align="left"|Gonzaga || align="center"|2 || align="center"|– || 148 || 3,648 || 1,262 || 363 || 1,904 || 24.6 || 8.5 || 2.5 || 12.9 || align=center|
|-
|align="left"| || align="center"|G/F || align="left"|UCLA || align="center"|3 || align="center"|– || 172 || 2,969 || 423 || 206 || 1,000 || 17.3 || 2.5 || 1.2 || 5.8 || align=center|
|-
|align="left"| || align="center"|C || align="left"|Florida || align="center"|1 || align="center"| || 33 || 297 || 78 || 14 || 111 || 9.0 || 2.4 || 0.4 || 3.4 || align=center|
|-
|align="left"| || align="center"|F/C || align="left"|Chattanooga || align="center"|1 || align="center"| || 31 || 520 || 101 || 27 || 243 || 16.8 || 3.3 || 0.9 || 7.8 || align=center|
|-
|align="left" bgcolor="#FFCC00"|+ || align="center"|F/C || align="left"|Washington || align="center"|5 || align="center"|– || 354 || 11,913 || 3,059 || 1,446 || 6,009 || 33.7 || 8.6 || 4.1 || 17.0 || align=center|
|-
|align="left"| || align="center"|F || align="left"|Argentina || align="center"|2 || align="center"|– || 163 || 3,058 || 917 || 186 || 1,389 || 18.8 || 5.6 || 1.1 || 8.5 || align=center|
|-
|align="left"| || align="center"|F/C || align="left"|Rice || align="center"|1 || align="center"| || 16 || 55 || 9 || 3 || 19 || 3.4 || 0.6 || 0.2 || 1.2 || align=center|
|-
|align="left"| || align="center"|G || align="left"|Arizona State || align="center"|2 || align="center"|– || 147 || 2,725 || 261 || 241 || 1,498 || 18.5 || 1.8 || 1.6 || 10.2 || align=center|
|-
|align="left"| || align="center"|G || align="left"|St. John's || align="center"|2 || align="center"|– || 101 || 1,295 || 230 || 95 || 615 || 12.8 || 2.3 || 0.9 || 6.1 || align=center|
|-
|align="left"| || align="center"|F || align="left"|France || align="center"|1 || align="center"| || 49 || 559 || 142 || 23 || 232 || 11.4 || 2.9 || 0.5 || 4.7 || align=center|
|-
|align="left"| || align="center"|G || align="left"|Purdue || align="center"|5 || align="center"|– || 326 || 7,990 || 538 || 1,341 || 2,720 || 24.5 || 1.7 || 4.1 || 8.3 || align=center|
|-
|align="left"| || align="center"|F/C || align="left"|Oklahoma || align="center"|2 || align="center"|– || 57 || 922 || 242 || 41 || 398 || 16.2 || 4.2 || 0.7 || 7.0 || align=center|
|-
|align="left"| || align="center"|C || align="left"|Michigan || align="center"|1 || align="center"| || 3 || 11 || 2 || 1 || 0 || 3.7 || 0.7 || 0.3 || 0.0 || align=center|
|-
|align="left"| || align="center"|G || align="left"|Michigan State || align="center"|2 || align="center"|– || 131 || 2,331 || 215 || 570 || 769 || 17.8 || 1.6 || 4.4 || 5.9 || align=center|
|-
|align="left"| || align="center"|G || align="left"|Portland || align="center"|1 || align="center"| || 63 || 515 || 68 || 52 || 225 || 8.2 || 1.1 || 0.8 || 3.6 || align=center|
|-
|align="left"| || align="center"|G || align="left"|Texas A&M || align="center"|2 || align="center"|– || 101 || 1,499 || 187 || 240 || 501 || 14.8 || 1.9 || 2.4 || 5.0 || align=center|
|-
|align="left"| || align="center"|G || align="left"|Missouri || align="center"|1 || align="center"| || 1 || 7 || 0 || 1 || 0 || 7.0 || 0.0 || 1.0 || 0.0 || align=center|
|-
|align="left" bgcolor="#FFCC00"|+ || align="center"|C || align="left"|Marist || align="center"|12 || align="center"|– || 867 || 23,100 || 5,277 || 1,215 || 12,871 || 26.6 || 6.1 || 1.4 || 14.8 || align=center|
|-
|align="left"| || align="center"|G || align="left"|UNLV || align="center"|2 || align="center"|– || 160 || 5,844 || 628 || 1,034 || 2,840 || 36.5 || 3.9 || 6.5 || 17.8 || align=center|
|-
|align="left"| || align="center"|G || align="left"|Providence || align="center"|1 || align="center"| || 44 || 571 || 61 || 77 || 183 || 13.0 || 1.4 || 1.8 || 4.2 || align=center|
|-
|align="left"| || align="center"|G || align="left"|Temple || align="center"|2 || align="center"|– || 148 || 2,609 || 253 || 333 || 1,024 || 17.6 || 1.7 || 2.3 || 6.9 || align=center|
|-
|align="left"| || align="center"|G || align="left"|Purdue || align="center"|1 || align="center"| || 35 || 209 || 23 || 37 || 65 || 6.0 || 0.7 || 1.1 || 1.9 || align=center|
|-
|align="left"| || align="center"|G/F || align="left"|Cincinnati || align="center"|6 || align="center"|–– || 298 || 7,569 || 1,381 || 909 || 2,710 || 25.4 || 4.6 || 3.1 || 9.1 || align=center|
|-
|align="left"| || align="center"|G/F || align="left"|Georgia Tech || align="center"|1 || align="center"| || 61 || 857 || 122 || 79 || 430 || 14.0 || 2.0 || 1.3 || 7.0 || align=center|
|-
|align="left"| || align="center"|C || align="left"|Missouri || align="center"|5 || align="center"|– || 403 || 12,591 || 3,131 || 938 || 5,323 || 31.2 || 7.8 || 2.3 || 13.2 || align=center|
|-
|align="left"| || align="center"|G/F || align="left"|Serbia || align="center"|1 || align="center"| || 40 || 1,454 || 250 || 68 || 779 || 36.4 || 6.3 || 1.7 || 19.5 || align=center|
|-
|align="left"| || align="center"|G || align="left"|Nebraska || align="center"|1 || align="center"| || 71 || 1,275 || 145 || 209 || 458 || 18.0 || 2.0 || 2.9 || 6.5 || align=center|
|-
|align="left"| || align="center"|F || align="left"|Temple || align="center"|1 || align="center"| || 4 || 9 || 4 || 0 || 3 || 2.3 || 1.0 || 0.0 || 0.8 || align=center|
|-
|align="left"| || align="center"|G || align="left"|Eastern Washington || align="center"|3 || align="center"|– || 168 || 3,845 || 488 || 445 || 1,694 || 22.9 || 2.9 || 2.6 || 10.1 || align=center|
|-
|align="left" bgcolor="#CCFFCC"|x || align="center"|G || align="left"|Xavier || align="center"|2 || align="center"|– || 24 || 212 || 25 || 10 || 68 || 8.8 || 1.0 || 0.4 || 2.8 || align=center|
|-
|align="left"| || align="center"|C || align="left"|Croatia || align="center"|2 || align="center"|– || 33 || 208 || 44 || 5 || 75 || 6.3 || 1.3 || 0.2 || 2.3 || align=center|
|}

T to Z

|-
|align="left"| || align="center"|C || align="left"|Croatia || align="center"|2 || align="center"|– || 73 || 891 || 245 || 37 || 253 || 12.2 || 3.4 || 0.5 || 3.5 || align=center|
|-
|align="left"| || align="center"|G/F || align="left"|Marquette || align="center"|1 || align="center"| || 57 || 1,859 || 205 || 226 || 822 || 32.6 || 3.6 || 4.0 || 14.4 || align=center|
|-
|align="left"| || align="center"|G || align="left"|Wake Forest || align="center"|1 || align="center"| || 82 || 2,657 || 330 || 639 || 1,254 || 32.4 || 4.0 || 7.8 || 15.3 || align=center|
|-
|align="left"| || align="center"|G/F || align="left"|Cincinnati || align="center"|3 || align="center"|– || 96 || 1,454 || 300 || 244 || 299 || 15.1 || 3.1 || 2.5 || 3.1 || align=center|
|-
|align="left"| || align="center"|G || align="left"|Indiana || align="center"|2 || align="center"|– || 152 || 3,278 || 410 || 364 || 1,340 || 21.6 || 2.7 || 2.4 || 8.8 || align=center|
|-
|align="left"| || align="center"|G || align="left"|South Carolina || align="center"|1 || align="center"| || 2 || 4 || 1 || 2 || 2 || 2.0 || 0.5 || 1.0 || 1.0 || align=center|
|-
|align="left"| || align="center"|F/C || align="left"|Texas || align="center"|8 || align="center"|– || 417 || 7,924 || 2,250 || 462 || 2,408 || 19.0 || 5.4 || 1.1 || 5.8 || align=center|
|-
|align="left"| || align="center"|G || align="left"|Iowa State || align="center"|7 || align="center"|– || 398 || 12,016 || 1,368 || 2,786 || 4,144 || 30.2 || 3.4 || 7.0 || 10.4 || align=center|
|-
|align="left"| || align="center"|F/C || align="left"|Oklahoma || align="center"|4 || align="center"|– || 289 || 8,140 || 1,860 || 374 || 4,402 || 28.2 || 6.4 || 1.3 || 15.2 || align=center|
|-
|align="left"| || align="center"|G || align="left"|Dayton || align="center"|1 || align="center"| || 2 || 9 || 2 || 0 || 2 || 4.5 || 1.0 || 0.0 || 1.0 || align=center|
|-
|align="left"| || align="center"|G || align="left"|UCLA || align="center"|1 || align="center"| || 14 || 95 || 13 || 10 || 35 || 6.8 || 0.9 || 0.7 || 2.5 || align=center|
|-
|align="left"| || align="center"|G || align="left"|Ohio State || align="center"|1 || align="center"| || 27 || 571 || 86 || 64 || 192 || 21.1 || 3.2 || 2.4 || 7.1 || align=center|
|-
|align="left" bgcolor="#CCFFCC"|x || align="center"|F/C || align="left"|Texas || align="center"|4 || align="center"|– || 280 || 7,863 || 1,869 || 349 || 3,604 || 28.1 || 6.7 || 1.2 || 12.9 || align=center|
|-
|align="left"| || align="center"|F || align="left"|Fresno State || align="center"|1 || align="center"| || 5 || 44 || 7 || 2 || 10 || 8.8 || 1.4 || 0.4 || 2.0 || align=center|
|-
|align="left"| || align="center"|G || align="left"|Georgia Tech || align="center"|1 || align="center"| || 12 || 180 || 23 || 14 || 36 || 15.0 || 1.9 || 1.2 || 3.0 || align=center|
|-
|align="left"| || align="center"|C || align="left"|Ohio State || align="center"|2 || align="center"|– || 140 || 1,743 || 397 || 90 || 476 || 12.5 || 2.8 || 0.6 || 3.4 || align=center|
|-
|align="left"| || align="center"|F || align="left"|Louisville || align="center"|1 || align="center"| || 7 || 22 || 3 || 0 || 2 || 3.1 || 0.4 || 0.0 || 0.3 || align=center|
|-
|align="left"| || align="center"|G || align="left"|Saint Joseph's || align="center"|1 || align="center"| || 31 || 658 || 66 || 109 || 217 || 21.2 || 2.1 || 3.5 || 7.0 || align=center|
|-
|align="left"| || align="center"|G || align="left"|Tennessee || align="center"|2 || align="center"|– || 120 || 2,615 || 264 || 315 || 984 || 21.8 || 2.2 || 2.6 || 8.2 || align=center|
|-
|align="left"| || align="center"|G || align="left"|UCLA || align="center"|1 || align="center"| || 79 || 2,322 || 240 || 399 || 619 || 29.4 || 3.0 || 5.1 || 7.8 || align=center|
|-
|align="left"| || align="center"|F/C || align="left"|Xavier || align="center"|4 || align="center"|– || 285 || 8,727 || 1,987 || 799 || 3,979 || 30.6 || 7.0 || 2.8 || 14.0 || align=center|
|-
|align="left"| || align="center"|F/C || align="left"|Old Dominion || align="center"|1 || align="center"| || 15 || 105 || 15 || 2 || 23 || 7.0 || 1.0 || 0.1 || 1.5 || align=center|
|-
|align="left"| || align="center"|G || align="left"|William Paterson || align="center"|1 || align="center"| || 59 || 513 || 40 || 103 || 149 || 8.7 || 0.7 || 1.7 || 2.5 || align=center|
|-
|align="left"| || align="center"|F/C || align="left"|Western Michigan || align="center"|2 || align="center"|– || 27 || 149 || 41 || 9 || 68 || 5.5 || 1.5 || 0.3 || 2.5 || align=center|
|-
|align="left"| || align="center"|G/F || align="left"|Georgia || align="center"|1 || align="center"| || 19 || 152 || 16 || 9 || 33 || 8.0 || 0.8 || 0.5 || 1.7 || align=center|
|-
|align="left"| || align="center"|F/C || align="left"|Ohio State || align="center"|8 || align="center"|– || 577 || 18,455 || 4,494 || 1,402 || 8,637 || 32.0 || 7.8 || 2.4 || 15.0 || align=center|
|-
|align="left"| || align="center"|F/C || align="left"|LSU || align="center"|1 || align="center"| || 34 || 402 || 62 || 27 || 100 || 11.8 || 1.8 || 0.8 || 2.9 || align=center|
|-
|align="left"| || align="center"|F || align="left"|Barton CC || align="center"|4 || align="center"|– || 260 || 2,918 || 693 || 161 || 1,247 || 11.2 || 2.7 || 0.6 || 4.8 || align=center|
|-
|align="left"| || align="center"|G || align="left"|Baylor || align="center"|2 || align="center"|– || 152 || 4,456 || 458 || 995 || 2,001 || 29.3 || 3.0 || 6.5 || 13.2 || align=center|
|-
|align="left"| || align="center"|G/F || align="left"|Georgetown || align="center"|1 || align="center"| || 2 || 33 || 7 || 2 || 5 || 16.5 || 3.5 || 1.0 || 2.5 || align=center|
|-
|align="left"| || align="center"|F || align="left"|Memphis || align="center"|2 || align="center"|– || 111 || 1,523 || 259 || 81 || 617 || 13.7 || 2.3 || 0.7 || 5.6 || align=center|
|-
|align="left"| || align="center"|G || align="left"|New Mexico State || align="center"|2 || align="center"|– || 72 || 2,504 || 194 || 243 || 1,424 || 34.8 || 2.7 || 3.4 || 19.8 || align=center|
|-
|align="left"| || align="center"|G || align="left"|Wichita State || align="center"|1 || align="center"| || 12 || 86 || 12 || 8 || 30 || 7.2 || 1.0 || 0.7 || 2.5 || align=center|
|-
|align="left"| || align="center"|G || align="left"|Louisiana || align="center"|1 || align="center"| || 20 || 155 || 16 || 12 || 40 || 7.8 || 0.8 || 0.6 || 2.0 || align=center|
|-
|align="left"| || align="center"|G/F || align="left"|Indiana || align="center"|4 || align="center"|– || 159 || 1,718 || 126 || 154 || 394 || 10.8 || 0.8 || 1.0 || 2.5 || align=center|
|-
|align="left"| || align="center"|G || align="left"|Oral Roberts || align="center"|4 || align="center"|– || 215 || 3,987 || 446 || 822 || 1,094 || 18.5 || 2.1 || 3.8 || 5.1 || align=center|
|-
|align="left"| || align="center"|G || align="left"|Oregon || align="center"|3 || align="center"|– || 127 || 1,077 || 130 || 119 || 429 || 8.5 || 1.0 || 0.9 || 3.4 || align=center|
|-
|align="left"| || align="center"|F || align="left"|Pittsburgh || align="center"|1 || align="center"| || 56 || 693 || 123 || 42 || 155 || 12.4 || 2.2 || 0.8 || 2.8 || align=center|
|-
|align="left"| || align="center"|F || align="left"|Georgia Tech || align="center"|3 || align="center"|– || 236 || 7,333 || 1,483 || 478 || 2,793 || 31.1 || 6.3 || 2.0 || 11.8 || align=center|
|-
|align="left"| || align="center"|F || align="left"|Arizona State || align="center"|1 || align="center"| || 8 || 59 || 14 || 1 || 14 || 7.4 || 1.8 || 0.1 || 1.8 || align=center|
|}

References

External links
 Indiana Pacers all-time roster

+
National Basketball Association all-time rosters
roster